The Saint Martin skink (Spondylurus martinae) is a species of skink found in Saint Martin.

References

Spondylurus
Reptiles described in 2012
Reptiles of the Caribbean
Endemic fauna of the Caribbean
Taxa named by Stephen Blair Hedges
Taxa named by Caitlin E. Conn